Carpendale may refer to

People
Maxwell Carpendale (1865–1941), an Irish rugby international
Charles Douglas Carpendale (1874–1968), a Royal Navy admiral and BBC executive
Howard Carpendale (born 1946), a South African singer

Places
Carpendale, Queensland
Carpendale, West Virginia

See also
Carbondale, Illinois